David L. Anderson (born August 15, 1957 in Frontier, Saskatchewan) is a former Conservative member of the House of Commons of Canada representing Cypress Hills—Grasslands, a position he has held from 2000 until 2019. He was a member of the Canadian Alliance from 2000 to 2003. He is a businessman, and a farmer. He has received broad based support being re-elected in 2004, 2006, 2008 and 2011 with significant margins.

Anderson served as the Parliamentary Secretary to the Minister of Foreign Affairs in the Government of Canada of former Prime Minister of Canada Stephen Harper and, after being reelected in the Parliamentary riding of Cypress Hills-Grasslands in the 42nd Parliament of Canada, served as the Opposition Critic for Human Rights and Religious Freedom in the Official Opposition led by interim Leader of Her Majesty's Loyal Opposition in the House of Commons of Canada of the Parliament of Canada.

Anderson is a founding and steering committee member of the International Panel of Parliamentarians for Freedom of Religion or Belief.
On March 4, 2019 Anderson announced that he will not be seeking reelection in his Cypress Hills-Grasslands riding in the 2019 Federal election. After the 2019 General Election Anderson's nephew, Jeremy Patzer was chosen as the Member of Parliament for Cypress Hills-Grasslands.

Early years
Anderson was born in Frontier, Saskatchewan and graduated from Frontier High School in 1975. Anderson earned a Bachelor of Arts in Political Science at the University of Regina, and then earned a Masters of Divinity at the Canadian Theological Seminary in 1990.

Personal life
Anderson married his wife Sheila in 1982. They have two adult children, Amy and Andrew, and two grandsons, Josiah and Ellis. Anderson is an active businessman and farmer, he has been farming for over 30 years.

Municipal politics

Anderson served on the Eastend School Division Board from 1994 to 2000, he was a School Board Trustee from 1994-1997 and Chair from 1997 to 2000.

Federal politics
Anderson entered federal politics in 2000 and represented the federal riding of Cypress Hills-Grassland until 2019.

37th Parliament

On November 27, 2000, Anderson was elected as a Canadian Alliance Member of Parliament for the federal riding of Cypress Hills—Grasslands. Anderson won the seat with 18,593 votes – 61.6%, defeating Liberal candidate Marlin Bryce Belt, NDP candidate Keith Murch and Progressive Conservative William Caton.

Anderson was a member of the Standing Committee on Agriculture and Agri-Food and its Subcommittee on Agenda and Procedure.

As a member of the Official Opposition, Anderson served as Critic of the Canadian Wheat Board and Associate Critic of Agriculture.

From 2006 to 2010, Anderson served as Chairman of the National Prayer Breakfast in Ottawa. He has been committed to raising awareness of the need to protect religious freedom around the world, hosting annual Parliamentary Forums on Religious Freedom. In addition, Anderson worked with fellow MP Bev Shipley to present and pass Motion 382, which unanimously declared the Parliament of Canada's support for religious freedom around the world.

38th Parliament

On June 28, 2004, Anderson was re-elected as Conservative Member of Parliament for the federal riding of Cypress Hills-Grasslands. He won the seat with 18,010 votes – 60.63%, defeating Liberal candidate Bill Caton, NDP candidate Jeff Potts and Green Party candidate Bev Currie.

Anderson was a member of the Standing Committee on Agriculture and Agri-Food.

Anderson introduced Private Member's Bill, Bill C-285 – An Act to amend the Income Tax Act (exclusion of income received by an athlete from a non-profit club, society or association). Bill C-285 did not come into force, the last stage completed was second reading and referral to committee in the House of Commons.

As a member of the Official Opposition, Anderson served as Critic of the Canadian Wheat Board.

39th Parliament

On January 23, 2006, Anderson was re-elected as Conservative Member of Parliament for the federal riding of Cypress Hills-Grasslands. He won the seat with 20,035 votes – 66.47%, defeating Liberal candidate Bill Caton, NDP candidate Mike Eason and Green Party candidate Amanda Knorr.

Anderson was a member of the Standing Committee on Agriculture and Agri-Food, and the Standing Committee on Natural Resources.

During the 39th Parliament, Anderson was appointed Parliamentary Secretary to the Minister of Natural Resources, Parliamentary Secretary (for the Canadian Wheat Board) to the Minister of Agriculture and Agri-Food and Minister for the Canadian Wheat Board.

40th Parliament

On October 14, 2008, Anderson was re-elected as Conservative Member of Parliament for the federal riding of Cypress Hills-Grasslands. He won the seat with 17,922 votes – 64.35%, defeating Liberal candidate Duane Filson, NDP candidate Scott Wilson and Green Party candidate Bill Clary.

Anderson served as a member of Standing of Natural Resources and the Subcommittee on Food Safety of the Stranding Committee on Agriculture and Agri-Food.

Anderson was appointed Parliament Secretary to the Minister of Natural Resources and for the Canadian Wheat Board.

41st Parliament

On May 2, 2011, Anderson was re-elected as Conservative Member of Parliament for the federal riding of Cypress Hills-Grasslands. He won the seat with 20,555 votes – 69.8%, defeating Liberal candidate Duane Filson, NDP candidate Trevor Peterson and Green Party candidate Helmi Scott.

Anderson has served as a member of the Legislative Committee on Bill C-18, the Subcommittee on Bill C-38 of the Standing Committee on Finance, the Standing Committee on Natural Resources, the Standing Committee on Foreign Affairs and International Development and its Subcommittee on Agenda and Procedure.

Anderson served as Parliamentary Secretary to the Minister of Natural Resources and for the Canadian Wheat Board until September 19, 2013, when he was appointed Parliamentary Secretary to the Minister of Foreign Affairs.

42nd Parliament

On October 19, 2015, Anderson was re-elected as Conservative Member of Parliament for the federal riding of Cypress Hills-Grassland. He won the election with 25, 051 votes- 69.2%, defeating Liberal candidate Marvin Wiens, NDP candidate Trevor Peterson, and Green Party candidate William Caton.

On November 20, 2015, Anderson was named the Opposition Critic for International Human Rights and Religious Freedom in the Official Opposition Shadow Cabinet.

Anderson did not run for re-election in the 2019 federal election.

Canadian Wheat Board comment controversy 
In October 2011, Anderson mocked Canadian Wheat Board officials on his official Conservative party website by posting a video that national leader of Canadian Inuit Mary Simon immediately denounced for the repeated use of a racial slur. In the video, an animated character uses a pejorative term, Eskimo, which is considered derogatory towards aboriginal peoples in Canada, to suggest that the Canadian Wheat Board officials and the Inuit sound foreign and make no sense.

Electoral record

References

External links 
 Official site for David Anderson
 David Anderson - Facebook
 David Anderson - Twitter
 David Anderson - Youtube
 How'd They Vote?: David Anderson's voting history and quotes
 

1957 births
Canadian Alliance MPs
Canadian Christians
Conservative Party of Canada MPs
Living people
Members of the House of Commons of Canada from Saskatchewan
Saskatchewan school board members
21st-century Canadian politicians
University of Regina alumni